Muddy Waters (born McKinley Morganfield, 1913–1983) was an American blues guitarist and singer.

Muddy Waters may also refer to:

 Muddy Waters (American football) (1923–2006), an American college football coach
 Muddy Waters (album), a 1996 album by Redman
 "Muddy Waters", a 2015 single by LP from the album Lost on You
 "Muddy Waters", a 2017 song by Nikki Lane from the album Highway Queen
 Muddy Waters Research, an American stock market research company and investment firm

See also
 Muddy Water (disambiguation)